John F. O'Donohue is an American actor and former police officer who played Sgt. Eddie Gibson in the television series NYPD Blue.

Career
A twenty-year veteran of the New York Police Department, his first acting role was that of an armed guard in Knots Landing in 1991. The next year, he was hired as a main supporting character in every episode of the short lived, critically acclaimed Ben Stiller Show until its cancellation. He has since appeared in such programs as Diagnosis: Murder, Seinfeld, Everybody Loves Raymond, Brooklyn South and The West Wing. The only time that he has appeared in the opening credits was NYPD Blue when he joined the show on a regular basis for the second half of the eleventh season as the squad commander, Sergeant Eddie Gibson. Gibson had been a recurring character beforehand.

Selected filmography

Knots Landing (1 episode, 1991) - Armed Guard
Matlock (1 episode, 1991) - Detective Vorhess
L.A. Law (1 episode, 1992) - Jury Foreman
Doogie Howser, M.D. (1 episode, 1992) - Harry
Snapdragon (1993) - Fat Man
Reality Bites (1994) - Food Mart Clerk (uncredited)
Seinfeld (1 episode, 1995) - Gus
ER (1 episode, 1995) - Mr. Goodwin
Step by Step (1 episode, 1995) - Lester
The Single Guy (1 episode, 1995) - Fireman
Mad About You (1 episode, 1995) - Ernest
Chicago Hope (3 episodes, 1995–1998) - Detective Gene Pirro / Detective Ryan
NewsRadio (1 episode, 1996) - Stan
The Cable Guy (1996) - Prison Guard
Guy (1996) - Detective
Cybill (1 episode, 1996) - Stagehand
Diagnosis: Murder (2 episodes, 1996) - Jail Guard
Living Single (1 episode, 1996) - Kenneth Reed
Early Edition (1 episode, 1996) - Jordan Butler
Steel (1997) - Federal Reserve Guard
As Good as It Gets (1997) - Detective Ray
Everybody Loves Raymond (1 episode, 1998) - Harry
Living Out Loud (1998) - Sid
Simon Says (1998) - Bobby Morgan
The King of Queens (1 episode, 1999) - Jack O'Boyle
Just Shoot Me! (1 episode, 1999) - Sgt. Fanning
Suddenly Susan (1 episode, 1999) - Dirk
NYPD Blue (28 episodes, 1994–2004) - Det. Eddie Gibson / Court Clerk
Lucky Numbers (2000) - Bobby
Providence (1 episode, 2000) - Henry Pillup
The Family Man (2000) - Tony the Doorman 
The West Wing (1 episode, 2001) - Mr. Koveleskie
CSI: Crime Scene Investigation (1 episode, 2001) - Carl Mercer
CSI: Miami (1 episode, 2003) - Fire Marshal Ronnie Jameson
Law & Order (1 episode, 2003) - David Carlson
Crooked Lines (2003) - Detective Anderson
The Groomsmen (2006) - Pops
Lonely Street (2008) - Hank The Tank
Law & Order: Special Victims Unit (1 episode, 2009) - Stevedore
Meet Pete (1 episode, 2013) - Larry
Cop Show (9 episodes, 2015–2016) - Tommy

References

External links
 

Living people
Year of birth missing (living people)
American male film actors
American male television actors
New York City Police Department officers
20th-century American male actors
21st-century American male actors